The 2008–09 Macedonian First League was the 17th season  of the Macedonian First Football League, the highest football league of Macedonia. It began on 3 August 2008 and ended on 31 May 2009. Rabotnichki were the defending champions, having won their third title the previous year. Bashkimi withdrew from the championship due to financial reasons.

Promotion and relegation 

1 Bashkimi was withdraw from the First League due to financial reasons.

Participating teams

League table

Results
The schedule consists of three rounds. During the first two rounds, each team played each other once home and away for a total of 20 matches. The pairings of the third round were then set according to the standings after the first two rounds, giving every team a third game against each opponent for a total of 30 games per team.

Matches 1–22

Matches 23–33

Relegation playoff

Top goalscorers

Source: Macedonian Football

See also
2008–09 Macedonian Football Cup
2008–09 Macedonian Second Football League

References

External links
Macedonia - List of final tables (RSSSF)
Football Federation of Macedonia 
MacedonianFootball.com

Macedonia
1
Macedonian First Football League seasons